A Message from Mars (1913) is a British science fiction silent film. It is said to be the first British Sci-Fi film.

History
The story is similar to Charles Dickens' A Christmas Carol of 1843, but this story was successful as a play written by Richard Ganthony. The play had been issued as a book in 1912 creditted to Lester Lurgan (aka Mabel Knowles) and Ganthory. The film is said to be the first British Sci-Fi film and it continues the theme that the rich should care for the poor.

Plot
Horace Parker, played by Charles Hawtrey, is an exceedingly self-centered, wealthy young man. Not only is he a miser, but he also expects everyone else to conduct their lives according to his personal convenience.

Parker is engaged to Minnie Templer, but Minnie has discovered Parker's selfishness and she is on the brink of calling off the engagement.

On Christmas Eve, however, a messenger from Mars comes to Earth to show Parker the error of his ways. The two of them become invisible and eavesdrop on all the terrible—and true—things Parker's friends and family are saying about him.

Restoration

In September 2014, the British Film Institute announced that they were putting the restored film online on their website. This version is longer and restores the film's original tinting and toning.

Cast
Charles Hawtrey as Horace Parker
E. Holman Clark as Ramiel
Crissie Bell as Minnie Templer
Frank Hector as Arthur Dicey
Hubert Willis as a tramp 
Kate Tyndale as Aunt Martha
Evelyn Beaumont as Bella 
Eileen Temple as Mrs. Claremce
R. Crompton as the God of Mars
B. Stanmore as the wounded man
Tonie Reith as the wounded man’s wife

Taglines
"A fantastical photo-drama, in four parts."

See also
List of incomplete or partially lost films

References

External links
 
A Message from Mars  at The British Film Institute (full-length film)
A Message From Mars (1913) at SilentEra
Website with photo of Marquette, Michigan Opera House and copy of UK magazine cover showing poster for A Message From Mars
advertisement for the film

1913 films
1910s science fiction films
British Christmas films
British science fiction films
Films about extraterrestrial life
Mars in film
Films about invisibility
British silent feature films
British black-and-white films
British films based on plays
1910s British films
Silent horror films
Silent science fiction films
Christmas science fiction films